House at Pireus is a historic home located at Charlottesville, Virginia. It was built about 1830, and is a small -story, two bay, vernacular cottage.  It sits on a full basement and has a hipped gambrel roof of standing seam metal.  The house has a central stone and brick chimney.  It was probably moved to its present location during the last quarter of the 19th century.

It was listed on the National Register of Historic Places in 1983.

References

Houses on the National Register of Historic Places in Virginia
Houses completed in 1830
Houses in Charlottesville, Virginia
National Register of Historic Places in Charlottesville, Virginia
1830 establishments in Virginia